The Wellington City Dukes were a New Zealand rugby league club that represented Wellington City in the Lion Red Cup from 1994 to 1996. In 1997 one of the two Wellington Rugby League sides that competed in the Super League Challenge Cup was also called the Dukes.

Notable players
Earl Va'a
Paul Howell
Arnold Lomax.

Season Results

References

Sport in Wellington City
Defunct rugby league teams in New Zealand
Rugby league in Wellington
Rugby clubs established in 1994
1994 establishments in New Zealand
1996 disestablishments in New Zealand